HMS Gleaner was one of 21 s built for the Royal Navy in the 1930s.

Design and description
The Halcyon class designed as a replacement for the preceding Hunt class and varied in size and propulsion.

She was powered by two Parsons geared steam turbines, each driving one shaft, using steam provided by two Admiralty three-drum boilers. The ship's complement consisted of 80 officers and ratings.

Gleaner was armed with two QF 4-inch (10.2 cm) anti-aircraft guns. She was also equipped with eight  machine guns. Later in her career, the rear 4-inch gun mount was removed as were most of the .303 machine guns, one quadruple mount for Vickers .50 machine guns was added as were up to four single or twin mounts for 20 mm Oerlikon AA guns. For escort work, her minesweeping gear could be exchanged for around 40 depth charges.

Construction and career
Gleaner was completed by William Gray & Company, Hartlepool, as a survey vessel, but she was converted into a minesweeper when the war began.

On 12 February 1940, Gleaner sank German U-boat U-33 using depth charges and deck gun. The captain was Lt.Cdr. H. P. Price, RN.  The British seized some materials from the U-boat, including Enigma machine rotors VI and VII, whose wirings were unknown at the time.  The seizure was one of the "pinches" that aided the cryptanalysis of the Enigma.

The British merchant ship Astra II was torpedoed and sunk. The ship rescued 20 survivors on 29 August 1940. Gleaner rescued 68 survivors from the torpedoed Empire Tourist on 4 March 1944. She was sold for scrap in 1950.

References

Bibliography

External links
 HMS Gleaner (J 83) of the Royal Navy - British Minesweeper of the Halcyon class - Allied Warships of WWII - uboat.net HMS Gleaner (J 83)

 

Halcyon-class minesweepers
1937 ships
World War II minesweepers of the United Kingdom
Cold War minesweepers of the United Kingdom